Everyman was an English magazine from 1912 to 1916 and 1929 to 1935 edited first by Charles Sarolea and later by C. B. Purdom.

History and profile
Everyman was founded by publisher J. M. Dent in 1912. The original editor was Charles Sarolea. After publication temporarily stopped during World War I, the magazine was relaunched in 1929 by Hugh Dent. The first issue of the new release came out 31 January 1929 under the management and editorship of C. B. Purdom.

Francis Yeats-Brown was briefly the editor in 1933; he was forced to resign after only seven weeks when his advocacy of Fascism was not supported by the magazine's directors.

The magazine covered books, drama, music and travel and featured articles by renowned authors such as Ivor Brown, Arthur Machen, G. K. Chesterton, A. E. Coppard, Bertrand Russell and many others.

References

External links
 Everyman: his life, work, and books 1912–1916 V. 1
 Everyman: his life, work, and books 1912–1916 V. 2
 Everyman
 Everyman : The world news weekly. London 1933 entry at the British Library
 Everyman : Books, drama, music, travel. London 1929 entry at the British Library

1912 establishments in the United Kingdom
1916 disestablishments in the United Kingdom
Magazines established in 1912
Magazines disestablished in 1916
1929 establishments in the United Kingdom
1935 disestablishments in the United Kingdom
Magazines established in 1929
Magazines disestablished in 1935
Visual arts magazines published in the United Kingdom
Defunct magazines published in the United Kingdom
Magazines published in England